Powers is an unincorporated community in Jefferson Township, Jay County, Indiana.

History
A post office was established at Powers in 1867, and remained in operation until it was discontinued in 1935. Powers was platted in 1868 by Andrew Powers, Jr., and named for him.

Geography

References

Unincorporated communities in Jay County, Indiana
Unincorporated communities in Indiana